The 1895 Washington Agricultural football team was an American football team that represented Washington Agricultural College during the 1895 college football season. The team competed as an independent under head coach Fred Waite and compiled a record of 2–0, its first undefeated season.

Schedule

References

Washington Agricultural
Washington State Cougars football seasons
College football undefeated seasons
Washington Agricultural football